ICDD may refer to:
 International Centre for Diffraction Data, a nonprofit scientific organization
 Intellectual capital due diligence, part of operational due diligence
 International Center for Development and Decent Work, part of the University of Kassel
 ICD-D, self-optimising production systems in Integrative Production Technology for High-Wage Countries
 Institute for Civic Discourse and Democracy, an interdisciplinary, non-partisan organization formed by Kansas State University in 2004